Lee's Summit West High School is located at 2600 Southwest Ward Road in Lee's Summit, Missouri, United States. It opened in the fall of 2004 and is part of the Lee's Summit R-VII School District. Current enrollment is approximately 2000 students. The mascot of the school is the Titan. The school newspaper is the Titan Scroll, which is a member of the High School National Ad Network. After a $32 million bond passed in April 2006, the high school received facility improvements and an expansion which was completed in 2009.

Academics

In 2013, Lee's Summit West High School was selected as a Blue Ribbon School. The Blue Ribbon Award recognizes public and private schools which perform at high levels or have made significant academic improvements.

Athletics
Lee's Summit West is a part of the Greater Kansas City Suburban Gold Conference. Their rivals are Lee's Summit and Lee's Summit North. The following Missouri State High School Activities Association sports are offered:
Baseball (boys)
Basketball (boys & girls)
Cross country (boys & girls)
Boys state champions – 2008
Girls state champions – 2007, 2008, 2009, 2010, 2011
Football (boys)
State champions – 2007, 2010, 2013
Golf (boys & girls)
Soccer (boys & girls)
Girls state champions – 2005, 2006
Softball (girls)
Swimming (boys & girls)
Tennis (boys & girls)
Track and field (boys & girls)
Girls state champions – 2006, 2010, 2016, 2017, 2018, 2019,
Volleyball (girls)
State champions – 2007
Wrestling (boys and girls)

Notable alumni

Mario Goodrich - gridiron football player
 Evan Boehm – gridiron football player
 Michael Dixon – basketball player
 Matt Hall – baseball player
 Monte Harrison – baseball player
 Shaquille Harrison – basketball player
 Alex Lange – baseball player
 Trevor Rosenthal – baseball player
 Veronica Merrell – YouTuber
 Vanessa Merrell – YouTuber

References

External links
 Lee's Summit West High School website

Educational institutions established in 2004
Buildings and structures in Lee's Summit, Missouri
High schools in Jackson County, Missouri
Public high schools in Missouri
2004 establishments in Missouri